The Flame (Italian: La Fiammata) is a 1952 Italian historical melodrama film directed by Alessandro Blasetti and starring Amedeo Nazzari, Eleonora Rossi Drago and Elisa Cegani. It was shot at the Cinecittà Studios in Rome. The film's sets were designed by the art director Mario Chiari.

Plot 
With the Franco-Prussian War of 1870 imminent, a reception is held in the castle of the Counts Stettin. Guests included Colonel Felt, brother of Countess Yvonne, and his wife Monica. Minister Beaucourt arrives suddenly, in the past a companion in arms of the colonel and now his political opponent. Beaucourt, who is in love with Monica, tells Felt that his plans to defend the borders have been rejected, and the colonel is outraged. Beaucourt, taking advantage of Monica's disagreement with her husband, is assiduously courting her. Meanwhile, the banker Glogan, an ancient lover of Countess Yvonne, arrives at the castle, who in the past has lent large sums to the colonel, who is unable to repay the money. Glogan then offers to cancel the debt if Felt gives him the plans for the fortifications. Felt, indignant, kills the agent of the enemy. Beaucourt decides to take advantage of what happened to eliminate his rival, but in the end, thanks to Monica's intervention, knowing the true intentions of Glogan and the reasons that led Felt to kill, Beaucourt gives up taking action against the colonel.

Cast
 Amedeo Nazzari as Colonel Felt
 Eleonora Rossi Drago as Monica
 Elisa Cegani as Yvonne Stettin
 Roldano Lupi as Baron Glogau
 Carlo Ninchi as Count Stettin
 Delia Scala as Teresa Derrieux
 Rolf Tasna as Marcello Beaucourt
 Sergio Tofano as Belmont
 Mario Scaccia as Mauret
 Franco Jamonte as Capitan Dufresné
 Sofia Glinski as Contessa de Mauriac

References

External links
 

1952 films
1950s Italian-language films
Films directed by Alessandro Blasetti
Italian films based on plays
Italian historical drama films
1950s historical drama films
Italian black-and-white films
1950s Italian films
Films shot at Cinecittà Studios
Films set in the 19th century